Empatica Inc. is an MIT Media Lab spinoff company born in Cambridge, Massachusetts, operating in Healthcare, providing AI-enabled tools to advance forecasting, monitoring, research, and treatment. Empatica produces medical-grade wearables, software and algorithms for the collection and interpretation of physiological data. Empatica's wearables, Embrace2 and E4, track physiological signals such as Heart Rate Variability, electrodermal activity, acceleration and movement, skin temperature, and autonomic arousal. Embrace2 has been cleared by the FDA as a seizure alerting solution for epilepsy patients with generalized tonic-clonic seizures. The E4 is used by researchers for real-time physiological data capture. The company is headquartered in Boston, MA with offices in Milan, Italy, and Seoul, South Korea.

History 
Empatica Inc. was founded in 2013 in Cambridge, Massachusetts, by Matteo Lai, Simone Tognetti, Maurizio Garbarino and Rosalind Picard. Picard serves as part-time chief scientist and chairman of the board, while Lai is full-time CEO, Tognetti is CTO, and Garbarino is CSA.

In 2014, in partnership with The Epilepsy Foundation, Empatica launched a crowdfunding campaign on Indiegogo for the creation of a wrist-worn device for monitoring and alerting to grand mal seizures, and help reduce cases of Sudden Unexpected Death in Epilepsy (SUDEP). This device was called Embrace.

In January 2018 Embrace (both the hardware and its Alert software) received FDA-clearance for adults and became the first medical wristwatch to be cleared by FDA for use in Epilepsy. In November 2018 an updated version of the Embrace, called Embrace2, was released.

In January 2019, Embrace2 received FDA-clearance for children ages 6 and up.

In November 2022, the Empatica Health Monitoring Platform received FDA-clearance for continuous data collection to monitor SpO2, electrodermal activity, skin temperature, and activity associated with movement during sleep.

Collaborations 
The NASA-funded Translational Research Institute for Space Health (TRISH) is working with Empatica to develop a smartwatch able to monitor the health of the astronaut crew that will be on board the first manned mission to Mars.

Since 2018, Empatica has been working in partnership with the U.S. Government's BARDA Division of Research, Innovation and Ventures (DRIVe), under the Department of Health and Human Services (HHS), to collaborate on the development of a new smartwatch which will alert users when they are developing a serious respiratory infection before any symptoms appear.

In response to the COVID-19 pandemic, Empatica is collaborating with the U.S. Army Medical Research and Development Command (USAMRDC) to deploy a wearable and algorithm that enables the early and pre-symptomatic detection of COVID-19.

Empatica also partnered with Japanese multinational information and network technology company NEC in a health study to help Japanese employees measure their stress levels, as a response to the phenomenon of karoshi.

Prescription digital therapeutics company Pear Therapeutics is collaborating with Empatica to use its wearable sensors to evaluate withdrawal symptoms in patients with substance use disorder (SUD), opioid use disorder (OUD), and alcohol use disorder (AUD).

Products

Embrace 
Embrace is a smartwatch designed to detect generalized tonic-clonic seizures and alert caregivers in real-time via a companion app Alert. The idea for Embrace was born following a discovery developing sensors to monitor stress. Chief Scientist and co-founder Rosalind Picard and her colleagues at the MIT Media lab were initially working on a wristband to help children on the autism spectrum better communicate their emotional states. One of Picard's undergraduate students borrowed a couple of devices to bring home over the winter break and test them on his autistic brother. A spike in activity registered by one of the devices during this time, attributed to a grand mal seizure event, tipped Picard off to the technology's potential for seizure detection.

Embrace is also used by researchers, pharmaceutical businesses, and other healthcare investigators to collect medical quality data for research. In 2017, Sunovion used Embrace in a phase 4 clinical study of Aptiom, a drug meant to reduce seizures in people with epilepsy. In 2018, results were published showing that data collected by Embrace was useful in examining the nausea felt by passengers undergoing zero-gravity flight.

Alert App 
Alert is a mobile app and subscription service that works with Embrace2 to send out an emergency call and text message to listed caregivers, including their exact GPS location.

Mate App 
Mate is a mobile app that displays physiological data collected by the Embrace2. It displays sleep time, efficiency, fragmentation, and tosses and turns, as well as levels of physical activity and step count. It can also be used as a digital seizure diary.

Research Portal 
The Research Portal is a cloud-based software that enables researchers to virtually view and process the raw data collected by Embrace during their studies.

E4 Wristband 
The E4 collects real-time physiological data, which can be used to conduct in-depth analysis and visualization. The device is equipped with a PPG sensor, EDA sensor, 3-axis accelerometer, and Infrared Thermopile. The E4 is used by researchers to measure arousal in individuals within laboratory and/or naturalistic settings to study, for example, stress or other emotions. Studies conducted using the E4 range from testing wearables for predicting substance addiction relapses, to measuring the engagement of students in a classroom, to researching predictions in aggressive meltdowns in autism.

EmbracePlus 
In November 2019, Empatica announced EmbracePlus, a research smart watch which is built in partnership with the Translational Research Institute for Space Health (TRISH), under NASA’s Human Research Program (HRP) which develops innovative approaches to reduce risks to humans on deep space missions, including NASA’s Journey to Mars.

EmbracePlus is able to continuously and remotely collect and process key physiological signals from the wrist, including pulse rate, pulse rate variability, blood oxygenation, respiratory rate, skin temperature, electrodermal activity, rest, and actigraphy data.

Following a response to the Request for Project Proposals issued in May 2020, Empatica has received funding from the U.S. Army Medical Research and Development Command to deploy EmbracePlus (and the Aria algorithm) to enable the early and pre-symptomatic detection of COVID-19. The device will monitor a person’s vital signs, and check for patterns that suggest the presence of a COVID-19 infection. This can be used to help wearers self-isolate and seek testing without unwittingly infecting others.

In April 2021, EmbracePlus has received the European CE mark as a Class lla medical device.

Aria 
Aria was developed in response to COVID-19 and in partnership with the U.S. Department of Health and Human Services’ BARDA. It is a wearable AI system with an app and online dashboard, that can help contain an infectious transmission by automatically alerting individuals to the earliest physiological signs of a possible infection, even without any symptoms being present.

In November 2020 Empatica has received funding from the U.S. Army Medical Research and Development Command to deploy Aria (and the EmbracePlus smartwatch) to enable the early and pre-symptomatic detection of COVID-19.

In March 2021, Aria has received the European CE mark for early detection of COVID-19.

Empatica Care 
Empatica Care is an AI-powered platform that enables the continuous, remote monitoring of patients.
The subject's physiological data are collected by the EmbracePlus smartwatch and communicated to the Care App via Bluetooth. The data transferred to the cloud by the wearable device is automatically gathered inside the Care Portal, an online tool where professionals can visualize in real-time vitals of individuals who may be at work, at home, or in a different ward inside the hospital.

In March 2021, Care has received the European CE mark for early detection of COVID-19.

References 

American companies established in 2013
Companies based in Massachusetts
Health industry trade groups based in the United States